Alaena madibirensis is a butterfly in the family Lycaenidae. It is found in Tanzania. The habitat consists of rocky, Brachystegia-clad hills.

References

Butterflies described in 1921
Alaena
Endemic fauna of Tanzania
Butterflies of Africa